The Jackson Transit System (known as JTRAN) operates fixed-route and an ADA paratransit demand response service throughout the City of Jackson, Mississippi, United States. The base fare is $1.50, $1 for students with school ID; $0.75 for kids 6–14; and $0.50 for seniors at least 60, disabled or Medicare. There is a 3-children limit to kids below 6 who ride for free when accompanied by a fare-paying rider.

History

From October 1, 2015, until December 31, 2018, the services were operated under a contractual arrangement by National Express Transit. Beginning January 1, 2019, the operator has been Transdev. The service is managed by the city's Transit Services Division in the Office of City Planning, Department of Planning and Development.

Services
JTRAN operates Monday-Friday from 05:45 to approximately 19:45. Route 1 buses come by bus stops every 30 minutes. All other buses come by bus stops once every 60 minutes. Saturday service is available from 06:45 to 19:15 with buses coming by bus stops every 60 minutes. There is no service on Sundays or major holidays at this time.

All routes, except Route 12 depart from Union Station, located at 300 West Capitol Street and generally depart at 15 or 45 past the hour:
1: North State Street
2: West Capitol Street & Clinton Boulevard
4B: Belhaven
4R: Robinson Road
5: Bailey Avenue & Medical Mall
6/3: Virden Addition/Lake Hico
7: Terry Road
7: Raymond Road
8: MLK & Presidential Hills and MLK & Medgar Evers Boulevard
9: MetroCenter Mall & Walmart
12: Save-A-Lot & Tougaloo College (does not serve Union Station)

Fleet
As at July 2016, the fleet comprised 40 buses.

Depot
JTRAN operated out of a depot on University Boulevard. When National Express took over in October 2015, it moved to a new depot on Highway 80.

Fixed Route Ridership

The ridership and service statistics shown here are of fixed route services only and do not include demand response.

References

External links
 Official website
 JATRAN System Map

Bus transportation in Mississippi
National Express companies
Organizations based in Jackson, Mississippi
Transport companies established in 1965
1965 establishments in Mississippi